The 2013 Women's Cricket World Cup squads consisted of 120 players from 8 national women's cricket teams. Organised by the International Cricket Council (ICC), the 2013 Women's Cricket World Cup, held in India, was the tenth edition of the competition. Australia won the tournament for the sixth time, defeating the West Indies by 114 runs in the final.

Each team selected a squad of 15 players which was finalised by 24 January 2013, and any changes to that squad due to illness or injury had to be requested in writing, and approved by the ICC's Event Technical Committee. Once a player had been removed from the squad through this process, they could only return as an approved replacement for a different player suffering illness or injury.

England's captain, Charlotte Edwards, appeared in the tournament for the fifth successive time, the most of any player at the 2013 competition, while India's captain, Mithali Raj, made her fourth successive appearance. Entering the tournament, Raj was ranked top of the ICC's batting rankings, while Katherine Brunt of England was rated the best bowler. West Indian Stafanie Taylor, second in the batting rankings, was the top ranked all-rounder. All three players maintained their positions at the top of the rankings at the conclusion of the tournament.

At the conclusion of the tournament, an ICC panel selected their team of the tournament. The player of the tournament, New Zealand's Suzie Bates, was selected as the team's captain, joined by four English players—Edwards, Brunt, Holly Colvin and Anya Shrubsole—three Australian players—Rachael Haynes, Jodie Fields and Megan Schutt—two West Indians—Taylor and Deandra Dottin—and Eshani Kaushalya of Sri Lanka. Holly Ferling of Australia was selected as the twelfth player.

Key

Australia

England

India

New Zealand

Pakistan

South Africa

Sri Lanka

West Indies

References

Women's Cricket World Cup squads
squads